San Pietro in Guarano is a town and comune in the province of Cosenza in the Calabria region of southern Italy.

Geography
The town is bordered by Castiglione Cosentino, Celico, Lappano, Rende, Rose, Rovito and Zumpano.

References

External links
 www.sanpietroinguarano.org

Cities and towns in Calabria